is a former Japanese football player.

Playing career
Ezumi was born in Izumo on December 18, 1978. After graduating from Osaka University of Health and Sport Sciences, he joined the J2 League club Oita Trinita in 2002. Although Trinita won the championship of the 2002 season and was promoted to the J1 League, he played in fewer games than Hayato Okanaka and Riki Takasaki. He became a regular goalkeeper in April 2004. However he lost his position behind newcomer Shusaku Nishikawa in May. In 2006, he moved to the J1 club Omiya Ardija. He became a regular goalkeeper in place of Hiroki Aratani in June 2007 and played all 34 matches in 2008 and 2009. However he lost his position to Takashi Kitano in 2010 and he did not play again until 2014. In 2015, he moved to the newly demoted J3 League club, Kataller Toyama. Although he became a regular goalkeeper, he lost his position to Tatsumi Iida in July. He retired at the end of the 2016 season.

Club statistics

References

External links

1978 births
Living people
Osaka University of Health and Sport Sciences alumni
Association football people from Shimane Prefecture
Japanese footballers
J1 League players
J2 League players
J3 League players
Oita Trinita players
Omiya Ardija players
Kataller Toyama players
Association football goalkeepers